Amir Esmailian (Persian: امیر اسماعیلیان; born December 28, 1983), also known as Cash and Cash XO, is an Iranian-Canadian music industry executive, talent manager, and record producer. He is the co-founder of XO Records and the co-manager of the label's primary artist, singer the Weeknd. He has executively produced albums and songs for artists such as Nav (whom he also manages) and The Carters.

Early life and education

Amir Esmailian was born in Tehran, Iran on December 28, 1983, during the Iran–Iraq War. To flee the conflict, his family emigrated to Ottawa, Canada in 1988. Growing up, Esmailian was neighbors with future rapper and XO signee, Belly. The two would often go to recording studios together. He got his nickname, "Cash", as a child, given to him by his friend and future XO member, Hawk Marley. His first job as a 12 year-old involved making Canadian Football League trading cards. He is a graduate of Merivale High School in Ottawa.

Career

In 2002, Esmailian's friend and rapper, Belly, was signed to Wassim "Sal" Slaiby's Capital Prophets label (later the CP Music Group). Slaiby also hired Esmailian as the head of street promotion for the label. At age 19 in 2003, Esmailian began traveling with rapper and friend, Juelz Santana, on his tours. In 2007, he started co-managing Belly alongside Sal, which took him to Florida in an effort to help his client break into the club scene.

While living in Miami in 2011, Esmailian's friend, Hawk Marley, sent him some of singer The Weeknd's tracks when the artist was relatively unknown. Esmailian then drove to Toronto, Canada and began managing The Weeknd. In 2012, Esmailian, Slaiby and the Weeknd founded the XO record label as a joint venture with Republic Records. Through the XO and Republic partnership, the Weeknd released several albums in the following years, including Trilogy (2012), Kiss Land (2013), and Beauty Behind the Madness (2015). The latter album would be honored with two Grammy Awards. Along with Slaiby, Esmailian was named to Billboards "40 Under 40: Music's Young Power Players" list in 2015. Esmailian was also pivotal in the 2016 release of  Starboy, the Weeknd's third studio album that debuted at number one on the US Billboard Hot 100, received triple platinum certification and won Best Urban Contemporary Album at the 2018 Grammy Awards. On March 20, 2020, XO and Republic Records released the Weeknd's fourth studio album After Hours. The album debuted and peaked at number one on the US Billboard Hot 100 and received platinum certification. In March 2020, After Hours broke the record for the most global pre-adds in Apple Music history, with over 1.02 million users.

In 2016, Esmailian discovered the Toronto-based rapper and record producer Nav, signing him to XO and becoming his co-manager. In February 2017, Nav released his debut self-titled mixtape, in which him and Esmailian were the executive producers of. Esmailian would go on to be an executive producer on Nav and Metro Boomin's collaborative mixtape, Perfect Timing, alongside the two in July of that year.

In May 2018, Nav released his debut studio album, Reckless, in 2018, in which Esmailian executive produced alongside Nav. Also in June 2018, Esmailian earned songwriting credits on The Carters' Everything is Love album with "Friends", a song in which Nav co-produced since it was an instrumental version of a track left off from Reckless. He would again earn executive producer credits alongside Nav and The Weeknd on Nav's second studio album, Bad Habits, which was released in March 2019, and debuted and peaked at number one on the Billboard 200 chart. In May 2020, Esmailian, Nav, and The Weeknd again executive produced Nav's third studio album, Good Intentions and its deluxe reissue, Brown Boy 2, the former that once again debuted and peaked at number one on the Billboard 200 chart. Esmailian is also credited as a producer for seven songs and a songwriter for nine songs on the album. In November 2020, he would go on again to be an executive producer alongside Wheezy on Nav's commercial mixtape, Emergency Tsunami.

In April 2019, Esmailian premiered 21 previously unreleased songs on the fifth episode of The Weeknd's Beats 1 radio show, Memento Mori. Tracks by Lil Uzi Vert, Young Thug, Travis Scott, Gunna, Nav, 21 Savage, Offset, Gucci Mane, Future, and others were played. In 2020, Esmailian launched a Champagne named Noirblanc, under the house name Xavier D’Orsenac.

Songwriting and production discography

Notes

References

External links
The Weeknd official website

1983 births
Living people
Canadian record producers
Canadian music industry executives
Canadian people of Iranian descent
Canadian music managers
XO (record label)
Businesspeople from Tehran
The Weeknd
Businesspeople from Ottawa
Iranian emigrants to Canada